"Russian Woman" (stylised in all caps) is a song by Russian-Tajik singer Manizha, independently released as a single on 19 March 2021. The song represented Russia in the Eurovision Song Contest 2021 in Rotterdam, the Netherlands, after winning the pre-selection competition Evrovidenie 2021 – Nacionalniy Otbor.

Background

Controversy 
Many Russian viewers took offense to a singer of Tajik descent singing about Russian women and to the singer's activism for LGBT rights and women's rights, and left hate comments on the video and her Instagram account, demanding that she drop out of Eurovision. Yelena Drapeko, First Deputy Chairman of the State Duma Committee on Culture, suggested banning Manizha from performing in Eurovision under the Russian flag, commenting also that Eurovision offered no cultural value and was too politicized and pro-LGBT.

Eurovision Song Contest 

The song was selected to represent Russia in the Eurovision Song Contest 2021, after Manizha was selected through Evrovidenie 2021 – Nacionalniy Otbor. The semi-finals of the 2021 contest featured the same line-up of countries as determined by the draw for the 2020 contest's semi-finals. Russia was placed into the first semi-final, held on 18 May 2021, and passed into finals. The final was held on 22 May 2021, and the song won 9th place with 204 points.

Charts

Release history

References 

2020 songs
2021 singles
Russian-language songs
Eurovision songs of 2021
Eurovision songs of Russia
Songs with feminist themes
Songs written by Ori Kaplan